The 37th Guangdong-Hong Kong Cup was held on 31 December 2014 and 4 January 2015. Guangdong won by an aggregate 1–0.

Squads

Guangdong
 Head Coach:  Chen Yuliang

Hong Kong
 Head Coach:  Kim Pan-gon

Match details

First leg

Second leg

References

2014–15 in Hong Kong football
2015
2015 in Chinese football